Rockingham Road is a major road between Fremantle and Kwinana in the southern suburbs of Perth. It is allocated National Route 1 – part of Australia's national Highway 1 – between Stock Road in Munster and its southern terminus in Kwinana.

The first part of Rockingham Road is a main road and suburban distributor that goes from the southern edge of Fremantle into Hamilton Hill and Spearwood, passing the Phoenix Park shopping centre and the offices of the City of Cockburn. It then leaves the urban area (but not the metropolitan area).

After becoming Highway 1, Rockingham Road acquires a very wide median strip - at one point the northbound and southbound lanes are 180 metres apart. The road then passes the small towns of Wattleup and Hope Valley before entering the Kwinana heavy industrial area in Naval Base and Kwinana Beach.

After the intersection with Mandurah Road it changes name to Patterson Road and continues on to the city of Rockingham.

Major intersections
All intersections below are controlled by traffic signals unless otherwise indicated.

See also

References

Roads in Perth, Western Australia
Highway 1 (Australia)
Fremantle